Aleksander Kwaśniewski (born 15 November 1954) is a Polish politician and journalist. He served as the President of Poland from 1995 to 2005. He was born in Białogard, and during communist rule, he was active in the Socialist Union of Polish Students and was the Minister for Sport in the Communist government during the 1980s. After the fall of Communism, he became a leader of the left-wing Social Democracy of the Republic of Poland, a successor to the former ruling Polish United Workers' Party, and a co-founder of the Democratic Left Alliance.

Kwaśniewski was elected to the presidency in 1995, defeating the incumbent, Lech Wałęsa. He was re-elected to a second and final term as president in 2000 in a decisive first-round victory. Although he was praised for attempting to further integrate Poland into the European Union, he faced criticism for involving the country in the Iraq War. His term ended on 23 December 2005, when he handed over power to his elected successor, conservative Lech Kaczyński.

Early political career (1973–1995)

From 1973–77, Kwaśniewski studied Transport Economics and Foreign Trade at the University of Gdańsk, although he never graduated. He became politically active at this time, and joined the ruling Polish United Workers' Party (PZPR) in 1977, remaining a member until it was dissolved in 1990. 

An activist in the communist student movement until 1982, he held, among other positions, the chairmanship of the University Council of the Socialist Union of Polish Students (SZSP) from 1976–77 and the vice-chairmanship of the Gdańsk Voivodship Union from 1977–79. Kwaśniewski was a member of the SZSP supreme authorities from 1977–82.

From November 1981 to February 1984 he was the editor-in-chief of the communist-controlled student weekly ITD, then editor-in-chief of the daily communist youth Sztandar Młodych from 1984–85. He was a co-founder of the first computer-science periodical in Poland, Bajtek, in 1985. From 1985–87, Kwaśniewski was Minister for Youth Affairs in the Zbigniew Messner government, and then Chairman of the Committee for Youth and Physical Culture till June 1990.

He joined the government of Mieczysław Rakowski, first as a Cabinet Minister and then as chairman of the government Social-Political Committee from October 1988 to September 1989. A participant in the Round-Table negotiations, he co-chaired the task group for trade-union pluralism with Tadeusz Mazowiecki and Romuald Sosnowski. 

As the PZPR was wound up, he became a founding member of the post-communist Social Democratic Party of the Republic of Poland (SdRP) from January to February 1990, and its first chairman until he assumed the presidency in December 1995. He was also one of the founding members of the coalition Democratic Left Alliance (SLD) in 1991.

Kwaśniewski was an activist in the Student Sports Union from 1975–79 and the Polish Olympic Committee (PKOL); he later served as PKOL president from 1988–91. Running for the Sejm from the Warsaw constituency in 1991, he won the largest number of votes (148,533), although did not win an absolute majority. Kwaśniewski headed the parliamentary caucus of the Democratic Left Alliance in his first and second terms (1991–1995). 

He was a member of the Foreign Affairs Committee and chairman of the Constitutional Committee of the National Assembly from November 1993 to November 1995.

Presidency (1995–2005)

In an often bitter campaign, Kwaśniewski won the presidential election in 1995, collecting 51.7 percent of votes in the run-off, against 48.3 percent for the incumbent, Lech Wałęsa, the former Solidarity leader. Kwaśniewski's campaign slogans were "Let's choose the future" (Wybierzmy przyszłość) and "A Poland for all" (Wspólna Polska). 

Political opponents disputed his victory and produced evidence to show that he had lied about his education in registration documents and public presentations. There was also some mystery over his graduation from university. A law court confirmed that Kwaśniewski had lied about his record—and this did not come to light until after the election—but did not penalise him for it. Kwaśniewski took the presidential oath of office on 23 December 1995. Later the same day, he was sworn in as Commander-in-Chief of the Armed Forces at the Warszawa First Fighter Wing, in Mińsk Mazowiecki.

His political course resembled that of Wałęsa's in several key respects, such as the pursuit of closer ties to the European Union and NATO. Kwaśniewski also continued the transition to a market economy and the privatization of state-owned enterprises, although with less energy than his predecessor.

Hoping to be seen as "the president of all Poles", including his political opponents, he quit the Social Democratic Party after the election. Later, he formed a coalition with the rightist government of Jerzy Buzek with few major conflicts and on several occasions, he stood against movements of the Democratic Left Alliance government of Leszek Miller. At one moment, support for Kwaśniewski reached as high as 80% in popularity polls; most of the time it was over 50%.

In 1997, the Polish newspaper Zycie reported that Kwaśniewski had met former KGB officer Vladimir Alganov at the Baltic sea resort Cetniewo in 1994. First Kwaśniewski denied ever meeting Alganov and filed a libel suit against the newspaper. Eventually, Kwaśniewski admitted that he had met Alganov on official occasions, but denied meeting him in Cetniewo.

Kwaśniewski's greatest achievement was his ability to bring about a new Constitution of Poland to replace the modified Stalinist document then still in use. The failure to create a new document had been a criticism often levelled at Wałęsa. Kwaśniewski actively campaigned for its approval in the subsequent referendum, and he signed it into law on 16 July 1997. He took an active part in the efforts to secure Polish membership of NATO. 

He headed Poland's delegation at the 1997 Madrid summit, where Poland, the Czech Republic, and Hungary were promised membership; and the Washington summit, where on 26 February 1999, during the Kosovo conflict, which he supported, he signed the instruments ratifying Poland's membership of NATO. He also took an active part in promoting further enlargement of the alliance, speaking out in favor of membership for a further seven states and the open-door policy that leaves open the option of further members. 

He was an author of the 2002 Riga Initiative, a forum for cooperation between Central European states, aimed towards further enlargement of NATO and the European Union.

An advocate of regional cooperation in Central and Eastern Europe, Kwaśniewski hosted a summit of the region's leaders at Łańcut in 1996. Speaking out against the danger organized crime posed to the region, he submitted a draft of a convention on fighting organised crime to the UN in 1996. He was an active participant at meetings of regional leaders in Portorož in 1997, Levoča in 1998, and Lviv and Yalta in 1999.

After a history of sometimes acrimonious relations with Lithuania, Kwaśniewski was a driving force behind the presidential summit in Vilnius in 1997, at which the two countries' presidents signed a treaty of friendship. Poland subsequently became one of the strongest advocates of Lithuanian membership in NATO and the European Union and the strongest advocate of Ukraine in Europe. In 2000 he was re-elected in the first round of voting, collecting 53.9 percent of the vote. His election campaign slogan was: "A home for all—Poland" (Dom wszystkich—Polska). On 23 December 2000, he took office for the second term.

Following the 11 September 2001 attacks, Kwaśniewski organized an international conference in Warsaw, with the participation of leaders from Central, Eastern and South-Eastern Europe to strengthen regional activities in fighting international terrorism. Under Kwaśniewski's leadership, Poland became a strong ally of the United States in the War on Terror and contributed troops in the Iraq War, a move that was highly controversial in Poland and Europe. 

Poland was in charge of a sector of Iraq after the removal of Saddam Hussein. Polish membership of the European Union became a reality on 1 May 2004, during Kwaśniewski's second term. Both he and his wife Jolanta had campaigned for approval of the EU accession treaty in June 2003. He strongly supported including mention of Europe's Christian roots into the European Constitution. Thanks to his close relations with Leonid Kuchma, in late 2004 he became a mediator in a political conflict in Ukraine – the Orange Revolution, and according to some commentators, he played the major role in its peaceful solution.

After the release of the Senate Intelligence Committee report on CIA torture in December 2014, Kwaśniewski admitted that he had agreed in 2003 to host a secret CIA black site in Poland, but that activities were to be carried out in accordance to Polish law. He said that a U.S. draft memorandum had stated that "people held in Poland are to be treated as prisoners of war and will be afforded all the rights they are entitled to", but due to time constraints, the U.S. had not signed the memorandum. The U.S. had conducted activities in great secrecy at the site.

Controversial pardons
In December 2005, when his presidency was coming to an end, he granted clemency for a post-Communist deputy minister of Justice Zbigniew Sobotka, who had been sentenced for 3.5 years of prison for revealing a state secret (effectively, he warned gangsters about an operation against them). Kwaśniewski changed the prison sentence to probation.

Another case of Kwaśniewski's controversial granting of pardons was the Peter Vogel case. The story goes back to 1971 when Piotr Filipczyński, a.k.a. Peter Vogel was sentenced to 25 years in jail for a brutal murder (shortened to 15 years in 1979). Surprisingly enough, in 1983 (during martial law in Poland) he was granted a passport and allowed to leave the country. He returned in 1990 soon earning the nickname "the accountant of the Left" as a former Swiss banker who took care of more than thirty accounts of Polish social democrats. Despite an arrest warrant issued in 1987, Vogel moved freely in Poland and was eventually arrested in 1998 in Switzerland. After Vogel's extradition to Poland, in 1999 Kwaśniewski initiated the procedure of granting him amnesty. In December 2005 (a few days before leaving his office) Kwaśniewski pardoned Vogel despite the negative opinion of the procurer.

Rywingate
Kwaśniewski refused in 2003 to face a special parliamentary commission, which was set up to reveal all circumstances linked with Rywingate. Kwaśniewski argued, that the constitution did not allow parliamentary commissions to investigate the president, and there were no clear law opinions. The commission decided eventually not to summon Kwaśniewski. 

For a second time Kwaśniewski refused as a witness to face the commission investigating the privatization of Orlen petrol concern, in March 2005. He argued that the actions of commission members, being in opposition to the leftist government supported by him, were directed against him. He sought to undermine the commission by releasing considerable amounts of information to journalists while only belatedly making it available to the commission members.

Member of secret police allegations
In 2007, IPN revealed that Kwaśniewski was registered during communist times as an agent "Alek" of the secret police, the Security Service (Służba Bezpieczeństwa – SB), from 1983 to 1989. Kwaśniewski himself denied having been an agent in a special statement, demanded from politicians by Polish law, and a court confirmed his statement.

Post-presidency
On 7 March 2006, Kwaśniewski was appointed Distinguished Scholar in the Practice of Global Leadership at Georgetown University, where he teaches students in the Edmund A. Walsh School of Foreign Service about contemporary European politics, the trans-Atlantic relationship, and democratization in Central and Eastern Europe. He also teaches a course on political leadership, convened by Professor Carol Lancaster, with former Spanish Prime Minister José María Aznar. He is also Chairman of the supervisory board of the International Centre for Policy Studies in Kiev, Ukraine and a member of the International Honorary Council of the European Academy of Diplomacy.

In 2008 Aleksander Kwaśniewski became Chairman of the European Council on Tolerance and Reconciliation, a not-for-profit organization established to monitor tolerance in Europe, prepare practical recommendations to governments and international organisations on improving interreligious and interethnic relations on the continent. The organization is co-chaired by European Jewish Fund President Viatcheslav Moshe Kantor.

Since June 2012 Kwaśniewski and Pat Cox lead a European Parliament monitoring mission in Ukraine to monitor the criminal cases against Yulia Tymoshenko, Yuriy Lutsenko and Valeriy Ivaschenko.

Since 2011, Kwaśniewski has served on the Leadership Council for Concordia, a nonpartisan, nonprofit based in New York City focused on promoting effective public-private collaboration to create a more prosperous and sustainable future.

Kwaśniewski was also involved with the EU talks with the Ukrainian government about the association agreement with the EU that the Ukrainian parliament failed to ratify in November 2013. After the Maidan unrest had installed the transitional government under Yatsenyuk, who signed the EU association agreement for Ukraine in 2014, Kwaśniewski took up in a director's post in the gas company ″Burisma Holdings Limited″ which owns licenses for the major Ukrainian gas fields.

Possible illegal lobbying on behalf of Paul Manafort
In a plea agreement filed in United States Federal court on 14 September 2018, former Donald Trump campaign chair Paul Manafort admitted to organizing a group of former European heads of state to illegally lobby, starting in 2011, on behalf of then-Ukrainian president Viktor Yanukovych. The plea agreement describes one of the heads of state involved in this secret lobbying as a "former Polish President" who "was also a representative of the European Parliament with oversight responsibility for Ukraine." At least one press report claimed that Kwaśniewski was this former Polish President.

Awards

Aleksander Kwaśniewski has been honored to date with the following decorations:

 : Grand Master of the Order of the White Eagle (ex officio); Knight of the Order of Polonia Restituta First Class, Grand Master of the Order and President of the Chapter
 
 : Grand Cross of the Order of Vytautas the Great (1996), Grand Cross of the Order of the Lithuanian Grand Duke Gediminas (1999); Order of Vytautas the Great with Golden Chain (2005)
 : Honorary Knight Grand Cross of the Most Honourable Order of the Bath (March 1996); Honorary Knight Grand Cross of the Most Distinguished Order of St Michael and St George (October 1996)
 : Knight Grand Cross of the Order of Merit of the Italian Republic with Collar (1996)
 : Grand Cross of the Legion of Honour (1996)
 : Grand Cross of the Royal Order of Saint Olav (1996)
 : Grand Cross of the Order of the Redeemer (1996)
 : Grand Cross of the Order of the White Rose with Collar (1997)
 : Grand Cross of the Order of the Three Stars (1997)
 : Knight Grand Cross of the Order of the Netherlands Lion (1997)
 : Commander Grand Cross, with Collar, of the Order of the White Rose of Finland (1997)
 : Honorary Recipient of the Order of the Crown of the Realm (1997)
 : Order of Prince Yaroslav the Wise, 1st class (1997); Order of Merit, 1st class (2005)
 : Order of Infant Henry with Grand Ribbon (1997)
 : Grand Cross (or 1st Class) of the Order of the White Double Cross (1997)
 : Grand Cross with Ribbon of the Order of the Cross of Terra Mariana (1998); Collar of the Order of the White Star (2002)
 : Grand Cross of the Order of the Star of Romania with Sash (1999)
 : Grand Chain of the Order of Merit (1999)
 : Grand Cordon of the Order of Leopold (1999)
 : First Class of the Order of the State of Republic of Turkey (2000)
 : Grand Order of King Tomislav with Sash and Great Star (April 2001)
 : Grand Cross of the Order of Isabella the Catholic with Chain (2001)
 : Grand Cross of the Order of Merit of the Republic of Hungary with Collar (2001)
 : Collar of the National Order of the Southern Cross (2002)
 : Special Grand Cross of the Order of Merit "in recognition of the Special Merit" (2002)
 : Grand Cross of the Order of Merit of the Federal Republic of Germany (2002)
 : Grand Cordon of the Supreme Order of the Chrysanthemum (2002)
 : Collar of the Order of the White Lion (2004)
 : Collar of the Supreme Order of the Chrysanthemum (2004)
International: Order of the Smile (1993)
International: Golden Olympic Order of the International Olympic Committee in (1998)
International: Gold Order of Merit of the International Amateur Athletic Federation (1999)
International: Medal of Merit of the European Olympic Committee (2000)
Awarded doctor honoris causa by the Hebrew University in Jerusalem (2004), Kyiv-Mohyla Academy (2005) and the University of Vilnius (2005). In 2010, became an honorary citizen of Warsaw.
Kwaśniewski was awarded the highest distinction of the Polish Orthodox Church, the Order of Saint Magdalena, first degree with decorations (1998). He received the television "Wiktor" prize three times (1993, 1995, and 2000). 
In 2006, he was awarded the Jan Karski Award for opposing anti-Semitism.
In 2007, he was awarded the Common Wealth Award of Distinguished Service as a recognition of his outstanding achievements in the field of government. 
In 2009, he was the co-recipient (together with Valdas Adamkus) of the Knight of Freedom Award for his merits in favour of a peaceful end to the Orange Revolution. He was also the co-recipient (together with Romano Prodi) of the Steiger Award for his contributions to the building of the European community.

Personal life
In 1979, Kwaśniewski married lawyer Jolanta Konty in a civil ceremony. They have one child: a daughter, Aleksandra (born 1981).

He identifies as an atheist. In 2005, at the end of his second presidential term, the couple finalised their marriage in a low-key Catholic ceremony presided by Kwaśniewski's former presidential chaplain, in the presidential chapel.

See also

 Presidents of Poland
 2005 Polish presidential election

References

External links

 Aleksander Kwaśniewski – official web page

|-

|-

|-

1954 births
Living people
People from Białogard
Polish atheists
Polish socialists
Polish United Workers' Party members
Presidents of Poland
Members of the Polish Sejm 1991–1993
Members of the Polish Sejm 1993–1997
Democratic Left Alliance politicians
Walsh School of Foreign Service faculty
Collars of the Order of Isabella the Catholic
Collars of the Order of the White Lion
Grand Collars of the Order of Prince Henry
Grand Croix of the Légion d'honneur
Grand Crosses of the Order of the Lithuanian Grand Duke Gediminas
Honorary Knights Grand Cross of the Order of the Bath
Honorary Knights Grand Cross of the Order of St Michael and St George
Knights Grand Cross of the Order of Merit of the Italian Republic
Recipients of the Collar of the Order of the Cross of Terra Mariana
Recipients of the Order of Prince Yaroslav the Wise, 1st class
Grand Crosses of the Order of Polonia Restituta
Recipients of the Order of Merit (Ukraine), 1st class
Grand Crosses with Chain of the Order of Merit of the Republic of Hungary (civil)
Grand Crosses Special Class of the Order of Merit of the Federal Republic of Germany
Recipients of the Olympic Order
Recipients of the National Order of Merit (Malta)
Polish Round Table Talks participants
Candidates in the 2000 Polish presidential election
Candidates in the 1995 Polish presidential election
Grand Crosses of the Order of the Star of Romania
Recipients of the Order of the White Eagle (Poland)